State Highway 30 (SH 30), alternatively known as Hampden Avenue, Havana Street, 6th Avenue, and Gun Club Road is a state route in the independent city and county of Denver and the city of Aurora in Arapahoe County. Its west end is at Interstate 25 (I-25) and U.S. Route 285 (US 285) in Denver and its east end is at Quincy Avenue east of Aurora.

Route description

The route begins at I-25 and US 285 in Denver. It then winds eastward and exits Denver and enters Arapahoe at about 2.0 miles, then reenters Denver at about 2.3 miles. At 2.6 miles, the route changes direction to north and crosses SH 83 at 3.8 miles, where it again leaves Denver and enters Arapahoe County and Aurora. It continues northward, crosses the Highline Canal, and at 7.8 miles it then turns east again. At about 10 miles, it traverses across I-225. It then continues eastward, and forms the northern and eastern border for Buckley Space Force Base. It further leaves the Aurora city limit at about 18.3 miles, and finally ends at Quincy Avenue east of Aurora, adjacent to Exit 13 on E-470.

History

The route was established in 1955, when it began at SH 70 (deleted) southeastward to today's terminus. The southern terminus was moved to Smoky Hill Road by 1960 and to Quincy Avenue by 1966, when the road entirely paved. The section along Havana Street was added in 1970, when that part of US 285 was cut.

Major intersections

References

External links

030
Transportation in Denver
Transportation in Arapahoe County, Colorado
Transportation in Aurora, Colorado
U.S. Route 285